Hoh Rainforest is one of the largest temperate rainforests in the U.S., located on the Olympic Peninsula in western Washington state.  It includes  of low elevation forest  along the Hoh River. The Hoh River valley was formed thousands of years ago by glaciers.

Within Olympic National Park, the forest is protected from commercial exploitation. Between the park boundary and the Pacific Ocean,  of river, much of the forest has been logged within the last century, although many pockets of forest remain.

Climate
Hoh Rainforest is the wettest forest in the Contiguous United States, receiving over 100 inches of rain per year.
It is an Oceanic climate (Köppen: Cfb).

Flora

Coast Douglas-fir (Pseudotsuga menziesii var. menziesii), western red cedar (Thuja plicata), bigleaf maple (Acer macrophyllum), red alder (Alnus rubra), vine maple (Acer circinatum), and black cottonwood (Populus trichocarpa) are also found throughout the forest.

Many unique mosses and lichens are also present in the rainforest, such as lettuce lichen (Lobaria oregana), which "requires the cool, moist conditions found under the canopy of old-growth forests" and is consumed by deer, elk, and other animals.

Fauna
Much native fauna also makes the Hoh Rainforest their home, including the Pacific tree frog (Pseudacris regilla), northern spotted owl (Strix occidentalis caurina), bobcat (Lynx rufus), cougar (Puma concolor cougar), raccoon (Procyon lotor), Olympic black bear (Ursus americanus altifrontalis), Roosevelt elk (Cervus canadensis roosevelti), coyote (Canis latrans), Cascade red fox (Vulpes vulpes), and black-tailed deer (Odocoileus columbianus). Recently, naturalists are planning on reintroducing fishers to the forest and surrounding forests due to their almost extirpated population in Washington and the introduced Virginia opossum is beginning to make way to the region in and around the forest. 

The area is also home to the banana slug (Ariolimax columbianus), which has recently been threatened by the encroachment of a new species of slug, the black slug (Arion ater), an invasive species from Northern Europe.

Sights

The Hoh Rainforest is home to a National Park Service ranger station, from which backcountry trails extend deeper into the national park.

Near the visitor center is the Hall of Mosses Trail, a short trail—— which gives visitors a feel for the local ecosystem and views of maples draped with large growths of spikemoss. There is also the Spruce Nature Trail, which includes signs that identify various trailside trees and plants.

Gallery
 See also

References

External links
 Visiting the Hoh Rain Forest at the National Park Service
 Temperate Rain Forest at the National Park Service
 The Hoh River Trust, founded by the Wild Salmon Center and the Western Rivers Conservancy

Geography of Washington (state)
Natural history of Washington (state)
Pacific temperate rainforests
Forests of Washington (state)
Olympic National Park
Protected areas of Clallam County, Washington
Protected areas of Jefferson County, Washington
Washington placenames of Native American origin